Pyrgulina obesa is a species of sea snail, a marine gastropod mollusk in the family Pyramidellidae, the pyrams and their allies.

Distribution
This species occurs along the Atlantic coast of Africa, and is known from Ghana, Gabon, Republic of the Congo, Angola and Príncipe.

References

 Schander C. (1994). Twenty-eight new species of Pyramidellidae (Gastropoda, Heterobranchia) from West Africa. Notiziario del C.I.S.MA. 15: 11-78

Pyramidellidae
Gastropods of Africa
Molluscs of the Atlantic Ocean
Gastropods described in 1912